Daphnis and Chloe is a work from the 2nd century AD by the Greek author Longus. This story is the basis of several works of art:

Daphnis et Chloé (1747), pastorale héroïque by Joseph Bodin de Boismortier
Daphnis et Chloé (Offenbach) (1860), opérette by Jacques Offenbach
Daphne and Chloe (1879), painting by Filipino painter Juan Luna (1857–1899)
Daphnis et Chloé (1912), ballet by Maurice Ravel and Michel Fokine
Daphnis and Chloe (film) (1931), by Orestis Laskos
Daphne and Chloe (1951) ballet by Sir Frederick Ashton with music by Maurice Ravel

See also
Daphnis et Chloé (disambiguation)